Edwin Kenneth Green Jr. (born December 17, 1994), better known by his stage name Kenny Mason, is an American rapper, singer-songwriter and producer from West Atlanta, Georgia. He is known for his distinctive sound which consists of a fusion between grunge rock, hip hop, and elements of shoegaze.

Kenny Mason began gaining recognition after releasing his breakout single titled "Hit" in 2019. He released his debut album Angelic Hoodrat in 2020 which was met with public praise from fans and artists alike. He followed this album with a deluxe edition a year later titled Angelic Hoodrat: Supercut which was also met with praise and featured prominent rappers such Denzel Curry and Freddie Gibbs.

Early life 
Kenny started rapping in 2007 at the age of 12. Around the same time, he discovered and fell in love with bands such as My Chemical Romance, The Smashing Pumpkins, My Bloody Valentine, and Deftones through video games. In an interview with Rolling Stone, he explained; "I get a lot of ideas listening to them, from the heaviness of their guitars and their melodies." Kenny first started taking music seriously and actively pursuing it as a job at the age of 19, after working at Krispy Kreme for a few weeks and realizing that job was not for him.

Kenny talks about growing up in a rough area and being accustomed to violence at a young age in his music and interviews. In an interview with Clash he recalls a time when he was shot in 2014 and explains how it was a life changing experience that made him accept himself due to his mom being by his side in the ambulance.

Musical career
In 2014, Kenny Mason formed a group called House 9 with his friends, where the released mixtapes TvDinner, The Super Tape, The Big 9 Theory, on SoundCloud between 2014 and 2016. Mason described these mixtapes as "That was me trying to teach myself how to make beats for [me and] my homeboys, and figure out how to work Auto-Tune, how to record and make art at the same time. It's the definition of experimental."

From 2016 to 2018, Mason released the singles "22" and "4Real", which started to gain attraction. In 2018, he released the singles "Nike 2" and 2019's "G.O.A.T", before "Hit" broke out to receive millions of streams after release in 2019. In April 2020, Kenny Mason released his debut album, Angelic Hoodrat, described as an experimental fusion of melodic alternative-rock, trap, and R&B. In August 2020, Mason appeared as a guest feature on the single "Cereal" by IDK and JID. On December 9, 2020, Mason released three singles on the capsule [ruffs], including a feature from Denzel Curry.

Artistry 
Kenny names Lil Wayne, Future, Drake, Kendrick Lamar, and Kid Cudi as the influence to begin making music at an early age, as well as alternative bands Nirvana, Coldplay, My Bloody Valentine, Pixies, Deftones, and The Smashing Pumpkins. He cites fellow Atlanta artists Bankroll Fresh and Peewee Longway as his main influences on his rapping style.

Discography

Studio albums 
 Angelic Hoodrat (2020)

Mixtapes 

 Ruffs (2022)

Collaborative Mixtapes

 TvDinner (with Clark Scott) (2014)

 The SUPER Tape (with DvDx) (2016)

Extended plays

Singles

As lead artist

Guest appearances 

! scope="row" |"Dawg!"
|Marco Plus
| rowspan="2" |Tha Soufside Villain
|}

References 

1994 births
Living people
African-American male rappers
Rappers from Atlanta
Alternative hip hop musicians
Rap rock musicians
Trap musicians